Caserta is the capital of the province of Caserta in the Campania region of Italy. An important agricultural, commercial, and industrial comune and city, Caserta is located 36 Kilometers north of Naples on the edge of the Campanian plain at the foot of the Campanian Subapennine mountain range. The city is best known for the 18th-century Bourbon Royal Palace of Caserta.

History 
Anciently inhabited by Osco-Samnite tribes, modern Caserta was established around the defensive tower built in Lombard times by Pando, Prince of Capua. Pando destroyed the original city around 863. The tower is now part of the Palazzo della Prefettura that was once the seat of the counts of Caserta, as well as a royal residence. The original population moved from Casertavecchia (former bishopric seat) to the current site in the sixteenth century. Casertavecchia was built on the Roman town of Casa Irta, meaning "home village located above" and later contracted as "Caserta".

The city and vicinity were the property of the Acquaviva family who, being pressed by huge debts, sold all the land to the royal family. The royal family then selected Caserta for the construction of their new palace which, being inland, was seen as more defensible than the previous palace fronting the Bay of Naples.

At the end of World War II, the royal palace served as the seat of the Supreme Allied Commander. The first Allied war trial took place there in 1945; German general Anton Dostler was sentenced to death and executed nearby, in Aversa.

Pope Francis visited Caserta on Monday, 28 June 2014, together with a friend named Giovanni Traettino, the pastor of an evangelical, charismatic-Pentecostal Protestant church. The Pope apologized for the complicity of some Catholics in the persecution of Protestant Pentecostals during the fascist regime in Italy.

Geography 
Its municipality borders with Capua, Casagiove, Casapulla, Castel Morrone, Curti, Limatola (BN), Maddaloni, Marcianise, Recale, San Felice a Cancello, San Marco Evangelista, San Nicola la Strada, San Prisco, Sant'Agata de' Goti (BN), Santa Maria Capua Vetere, and Valle di Maddaloni.

Frazioni 
Casertavecchia - the ancient centre of the comune and former bishopric seat  
San Leucio resort - seat of famous Royal silk workshops, also is included in the World Heritage List  
Vaccheria - which housed the stable of the Royal cattle  
Falciano - a former bishop seat that includes a sixteenth-century palace
Piedimonte di Casolla - has an ancient Benedictine abbey, built over a Roman temple dedicated to the goddess Diana   
Other "Frazioni": Aldifreda, Briano, Casola, Casolla, Centurano, Ercole, Garzano, Mezzano, Pozzovetere, Puccianiello, Sala di Caserta, San Benedetto, San Clemente, Santa Barbara, Staturano, Tredici, Tuoro

Climate 
The city of Caserta is located in the largest flat area of Campania and is surrounded by the Apennine mountains. The particular position favors the beneficial influences of the sea which, especially in winter, makes temperatures mild. During the summer season, this area is one of the hottest in the region, with maximum temperatures sometimes exceeding 30 degrees.
The inland areas extend to the surrounding mountains, often affected by the cold currents of the north-east with fairly low temperatures and snow in winter. The Matese is the coldest and snowiest in the whole area.

Honors 
The city of Caserta distinguished itself during the Second World War, in fact, it was decorated with the gold medal for civil valor and the bronze medal for military valor for the heroic actions and losses suffered during the war. The city was fiercely bombed and suffered a violent reprisal, but it managed to resist and, with the return of peace, all the people collaborated in the reconstruction of Caserta.

Government 

Carlo Marino, mayor of Caserta was elected mayor of Caserta in June 2016 with 62.74%.

Main sights 
Caserta's main attraction is its Palace of Caserta (listed as a UNESCO World Heritage Site). The royal palace ("Reggia") was designed in the eighteenth century by the Italian architect Luigi Vanvitelli, recalling Versailles, as a residence for the Bourbon kings of Naples and Sicily.

As one of the most visited monuments in Italy, the palace has more than 1200 rooms, decorated in various styles. It has been the set for several famous movies such as Star Wars: Episode I – The Phantom Menace, Star Wars: Episode II – Attack of the Clones, Angels & Demons, and Mission: Impossible III.
Palazzo Vecchio ("Old Palace"), a construction of the fourteenth century renovated by Luigi Vanvitelli as provisional residence for the royal court   
The cathedral (1800s)  
The Aqueduct of Vanvitelli (eighteenth century)

Piazzas 
Piazza Matteotti is one of oldest squares in the city, it is called "Piazza Mercato" (Market Square) by Casertani, because there is the daily market in a building inaugurated in 2008.
Piazza Vanvitelli is the main square in the city. The square once included Palazzo Castropignano, but this was subsequently replaced by a modern palace in the early 1960s. The seat of the municipality of Caserta, Palazzo Acquaviva lies within Piazza Vanvitelli as well as the offices of Questura and Prefettura of the Province of Caserta and various banks, shops, hotels, and bars. At the center of the square there is a statue of Luigi Vanvitelli, the architect who designed the Royal Palace of Caserta.

Gallery

Sports 
The city has some experience in hosting major international sports events, such as the EuroBasket 1969.

It is home to Juvecaserta Basket, Italy's 1991 basketball champion.

Transport 
Caserta railway station is a hub for regional and national traffic, and represents an important interchange linking Rome and Naples to Bari.

Caserta is the starting point of the A30 motorway to Salerno and is served by two exits of A1 motorway: Caserta Nord (Caserta North, near Casagiove and Casapulla) and Caserta Sud (Caserta South, near Marcianise and San Marco Evangelista).

Twin towns — sister cities 
Caserta is twinned with:
 Pitești, Romania
 Aley, Lebanon

Notable people 

 Italian writer Maria Valtorta
 Italian actor Tony Servillo
 Air power theorist Giulio Douhet
 English cricketer Hedley Verity is buried there, having died in a Caserta hospital on 31 July 1943 of wounds sustained in the World War II Allied invasion of Sicily
 Fictional character Jennifer Melfi of The Sopranos said her family was from Caserta
Yenni Apperti, Planetary Fellow of Raggio dell'Raggio Planetary Centre & "orthopedist"

See also 

Seconda Università degli Studi di Napoli
Casertana F.C.

References

External links 
Official website (in Italian)